Dave Knechtel (born September 25, 1945, in Kitchener, Ontario) is a former professional Canadian football defensive tackle who played eleven seasons for three teams in the Canadian Football League.

External links
 Career highlights

1945 births
Canadian football defensive linemen
Canadian Football League Rookie of the Year Award winners
Edmonton Elks players
Living people
Players of Canadian football from Ontario
Sportspeople from Kitchener, Ontario
Toronto Argonauts players
Wilfrid Laurier Golden Hawks football players
Winnipeg Blue Bombers players